Eunice High School is a public high school located in Eunice, in the far western end of St. Landry Parish, Louisiana, United States. It is operated by the St. Landry Parish School Board. Eunice High graduated its first class in 1910; the current building was built in 1966. In 1969, St. Landry Parish's former Charles Drew High School for African-American students was merged into Eunice High as part of desegregation. The address is 301 S Bobcat Dr. Eunice, LA 70535

Eunice High School athletics
Eunice High is a member of the Louisiana High School Athletic Association. 

The Eunice High School Battling Bobcats are in District 4-4A and participate in football, baseball, softball, track, basketball, and tennis.

Championships
Football championships
(2) State Championships: 1982, 2018

Notable alumni 

Danneel Ackles (Class of 1997) - actress
Kyries Hebert - professional football player
Curtis Joubert - former mayor of Eunice and member of Louisiana House of Representatives, was a teacher, basketball coach, and assistant principal at Eunice High School in early 1960s
Elwyn Nicholson - Louisiana state senator from Jefferson Parish from 1972 to 1988; grocery chain owner
Keith Ortego - football player
Tharold Simon - former NFL defensive back, played NCAA football at LSU, drafted by Seattle Seahawks
Dale Sittig (Class of 1959) - director of Louisiana Offshore Termninal Authority; former member of Louisiana Public Service Commission and  Louisiana House of Representatives
Stuart Turner - MLB catcher for Cincinnati Reds, won national championship at LSUE in 2012, attended Ole Miss where he won Johnny Bench Award for best NCAA catcher; drafted by Minnesota Twins and claimed by Reds in Rule 5 draft

References

External links 
 

Public high schools in Louisiana
Schools in St. Landry Parish, Louisiana